Christophe Ferron (born 27 October 1970) is a French football manager and former professional player who played as a defender. During a 15-year professional career, Ferron made a total of 432 league appearances for Stade Lavallois and FC Lorient.

References

1970 births
Living people
Footballers from Le Mans
French footballers
Association football defenders
Stade Lavallois players
FC Lorient players
US Alençon players
Ligue 1 players
French football managers